Illinois's 9th House of Representatives district is a Representative district within the Illinois House of Representatives located in Cook County, Illinois. It has been represented by Democrat Lakesia Collins since July 24, 2020. The district was previously represented by Democrat Art Turner from 2010 to 2020.

The district includes parts of the Chicago neighborhoods of East Garfield Park, Lincoln Park, Loop, Lower West Side, Near North Side, Near West Side, North Lawndale, South Lawndale, West Garfield Park, and West Town.

Representative district history

Prominent representatives

List of representatives

1849 – 1873

1957 – 1973

1983 – Present

Historic District Boundaries

Electoral history

2030 – 2022

2020 – 2012

2010 – 2002

2000 – 1992

1990 – 1982

1970 – 1962

1960 – 1956

Notes

References

Illinois House of Representatives districts
Government of Chicago